Seguenzia donaldi is a species of extremely small deep water sea snail, a marine gastropod mollusk in the family Seguenziidae.

References

External links
 Encyclopedia of Life 
 World Register of Marine Species 

donaldi